Leopoldo Romañach y Guillen (1862–1951) was a Cuban painter. He was born in Sierra Morena, Corralillo, in the province of Las Villas.

Romañach was a professor of color theory at San Alejandro, won a number of awards. The Republic of Cuba granted him in 1950 the Great Cross of the National Order of Merit of Carlos Manuel de Cespedes.

The school "Escuela Provincial de Artes Plásticas “Leopoldo Romañach” in Santa Clara, Las Villas, Cuba was named after him.

Amelia Peláez, Lesbia Vent Dumois, Jesus Castellanos, and Víctor Manuel García Valdés were among his students.

References 

 http://www.cernudaarte.com/cgi-local/artists.cgi?aid=28
 http://www.artnet.com/artist/587815/leopoldo-romanach.html

1862 births
1951 deaths
19th-century Cuban painters
19th-century male artists
20th-century Cuban painters
20th-century Cuban male artists
Male painters